Inositol polyphosphate-4-phosphatase, type II, 105kDa is a protein that in humans is encoded by the INPP4B gene.

INPP4B encodes the inositol polyphosphate 4-phosphatase type II, a dual specificity phosphatase.  INPP4B is involved in phosphatidylinositol signaling pathways. This enzyme removes the phosphate group at position 4 of the inositol ring from inositol 3,4-bisphosphate and phosphate groups from phosphotyrosines. There is limited data to suggest that the human type II enzyme is subject to alternative splicing, as has been established for the type I enzyme.

References

Further reading 

 
 
 
 
 
 
 
 
 
 
 

EC 3.1.3